Simplastrea is a monotypic genus of large polyp stony coral from the Indian Ocean. It is represented by a single species, Simplastrea vesicularis.

Description
Colonies of Simplastrea vesicularis are flat and encrusting with circular corallites that are spaced evenly by beaded coenosteum.
It has thin walls, well-developed septae that are thin and straight with inner margins forming a columella tangle. The entire surface of Simplastrea vesicularis is covered in small tentacles displaying slight extension.

Distribution and habitat
It can be found throughout the Indian Ocean and Indo-Pacific in the shallow waters of Papua New Guinea and Indonesia where it encrusts rock surfaces of coral reefs.

References 

Scleractinia genera
Monotypic cnidarian genera
Euphylliidae